Warfield is a village at the bottom of the Rossland hill, immediately west of Trail, in the West Kootenay region of southern British Columbia.

Settlement
Warfield was named after Carlos Warfield, a business partner of Fritz Augustus Heinze, who built the Trail smelter. Annable, Mickey Mouse Town, and Minnie Mouse Town are among its six distinct neighbourhoods. In the 1930s, the Consolidated Mining and Smelting Company (CM&S) built a residential area to house employees. Warfield incorporated as a village in 1952.

Fertilizer farm
In 1919, CM&S bought a tract of land at Warfield to supply cheap produce for its workers, and show that pollution from the Trail smelter was not as significant as critics claimed, but the farm proved the converse. Following the installation of a pollution control device in 1925, the captured dust was taken to a plant built at the farm that converted the material into a variety of fertilizers. By 1931, the company produced hydrogen, nitrogen, ammonia, ammonia sulphate, phosphite and phosphoric acid-based products.

By 1941, the Warfield plant output of ordinance-grade ammonium nitrate was directed to munitions during World War II. In addition, the US military needed heavy water for the Manhattan Project. The only two sources in the world were Vemork, Norway, under German occupation, and Trail, where electrolytic hydrogen was a by-product of the CM&S sulfur recovery process. CM&S was directed by the federal government to build a heavy water plant at Warfield, which was funded by the US, and operated from 1943 to 1956. A 14-storey concrete building in the midst of the fertilizer complex has evidenced the strategic project.

Rossland CP line
In 1896, Warfield was one of two intermediate stations opened. In 1966, Canadian Pacific Railway (CP) abandoned the Rossland spur west of Warfield.

Demographics 

Religion 
According to the 2021 census, religious groups in Warfield included:
Irreligion (1,060 persons or 60.7%)
Christianity (635 persons or 36.4%)
Other (10 persons or 0.6%)

Government 
On the provincial level, Warfield is a part of the electoral district of Kootenay West (provincial electoral district). The riding, which has traditionally voted for the British Columbia New Democratic Party, is currently represented by NDP MLA Katrine Conroy.

In the House of Commons of Canada, Warfield is represented in the electoral district of South Okanagan—West Kootenay. Created prior to the 2015 General Election, the seat is currently held by NDP Member of Parliament Richard Cannings (British Columbia politician).

School District 
The current school district for Warfield is School District 20 Kootenay-Columbia. Currently, Warfield offers one elementary school and one preschool.

Schools

Climate
Warfield has a humid continental climate (Dfb) with warm, sometimes hot summer days along with cool nights and moderately cold, snowy winters with annual snowfall averaging .

References

External links 

Villages in British Columbia
Populated places in the West Kootenay
British Columbia populated places on the Columbia River